Árni Stefánsson (born 10 October 1953) is an Icelandic former footballer who played as a goalkeeper. He won 15 caps for the Iceland national football team between 1975 and 1978.

External links

1953 births
Living people
Arni Stefansson
Arni Stefansson
Association football goalkeepers
Allsvenskan players
Arni Stefansson
Landskrona BoIS players
Jönköpings Södra IF players
Arni Stefansson
Arni Stefansson
Arni Stefansson
Expatriate footballers in Sweden